Commercial law, also known as mercantile law or trade law, is the body of law that applies to the rights, relations, and conduct of persons and business engaged in commerce, merchandising, trade, and sales. It is often considered to be a branch of civil law and deals with issues of both private law and public law.

Commercial law includes within its compass such titles as principal and agent; carriage by land and sea; merchant shipping; guarantee; marine, fire, life, and accident insurance; bills of exchange, negotiable instruments, contracts and partnership. Many of these categories fall within Financial law, an aspect of Commercial law pertaining specifically to financing and the financial markets. It can also be understood to regulate corporate contracts, hiring practices, and the manufacture and sales of consumer goods. Many countries have adopted civil codes that contain comprehensive statements of their commercial law.

In the United States, commercial law is the province of both the United States Congress, under its power to regulate interstate commerce, and the states, under their police power. Efforts have been made to create a unified body of commercial law in the United States; the most successful of these attempts has resulted in the general adoption of the Uniform Commercial Code, which has been adopted in all 50 states (with some modification by state legislatures), the District of Columbia, and the U.S. territories.

Various regulatory schemes control how commerce is conducted, particularly vis-a-vis employees and customers. Privacy laws, safety laws (e.g., the Occupational Safety and Health Act in the United States), and food and drug laws are some examples.

History
During Middle Ages, Italy was the cradle of many modern institutions at the basis of commercial law. Around the 16th century, the trade of Italian maritime republics was the promoter of the birth of commercial law: the jurist Benvenuto Stracca, (Ancona, 1509–1579) published in 1553 the treatise De mercatura seu mercatore tractats; it was one of the first, if not the first, legal imprint dealing specifically with commercial law. This treatise focused on merchants and merchant contracts, practices and maritime rights, to which he soon added extensive discussions of bankruptcy, factors and commissions, third party transfers, and insurance. For this reason, Stracca is often considered the father of commercial law and author of the first Italian treaty about the insurance contract, beyond about the commerce. The legal work of Italian jurists had an impact on Holland, Germany, England and France.

See also
 Outline of commercial law
 Consulate of the Sea

Notes

External links

 Hundreds of Answers to Basic Business Law Questions
 Topical listing of US commercial law from Cornell's Legal Information Institute